Restrepia falkenbergii, commonly called the Falkenberg's restrepia, is an epiphytic orchid, found at altitudes between 1,000 and 2,000 m in Colombia.

This large orchid lacks pseudobulbs. The erect, thick, leathery leaf is elliptic-ovate in shape. The aerial roots seem like fine hairs.

The flowers develop one at a time at the base of the leaf. They are borne on a slender peduncle, originating from the base of the back of the leaf. The long dorsal sepal is erect and ends in a somewhat thicker club-shaped tip. They have fused lateral sepals (synsepals) with a length of about 2.5 cm. These are quite colorful : overall yellow, with orange, tan and red at the back, overlaid with contrasting reddish-purple stripes.  The long, lateral petals equally end in a thickened club-shaped tip.

The long and smooth lip is pandurate and  widest its apex. It shows the same variations in color and markings.

References

External links 

falkenbergii
Epiphytic orchids
Orchids of Colombia